The Id Kah Mosque (from Persian: عیدگاه, Eidgāh, meaning "Place of Festivities") is a historic mosque and tourist site located in Kashgar, Xinjiang, China.

History
The mosque was built by Saqsiz Mirza, the elder of two sons of Amir Sayyid Ali, in 1442 (although it incorporated older structures dating back to 996) to commemorate his ancestors. The mosque covers an area of around 16,000 square meters.

The mosque's modern golden-brick structure was built in 1798, replacing the older building, and was further expanded in 1838 to its current size.

On 9 August 1933, Chinese Muslim General Ma Zhancang killed and beheaded the Uyghur leader Timur Beg, displaying his head on a spike at Id Kah mosque.

In March 1934, it was reported that the Uyghur emir Abdullah Bughra was also beheaded, the head being displayed at Id Kah mosque.

In April 1934, the Chinese Muslim general Ma Zhongying gave a speech at Id Kah Mosque in Kashgar, telling the Uyghurs to be loyal to the Republic of China Kuomintang government of Nanjing.

The mosque received a renovation in 1981, and the mosque's façade was covered with tiles between 2004 and 2005.

On 30 July 2014, the imam of the mosque at the time, Jume Tahir, was stabbed to death by extremists shortly after attending morning prayers. His unknown successor was jailed for 15 years by the Chinese authorities in 2017, having been accused of spreading extremism.

The current imam of the mosque is Memet Jume.

Decline in attendance
In 2009, Id Kah was the largest mosque in Xinjiang and in China. Every Friday, it housed nearly 10,000 worshippers and could accommodate up to 20,000. On other days of the week, around 2,000 Muslims came to the mosque to pray.

In 2011, between 4,000 and 5,000 people attended Friday prayers in the mosque. However, the current mosque's imam, Memet Jume, said in a 2021 interview with the Associated Press that the number of worshippers attending Friday prayers at the mosque dropped to between 800 and 900 in 2021; he attributed the drop to "a natural shift in values", rather than Chinese government policies.

Architecture
The mosque incorporates architectural features observed in Central Asian, West Asian and to a lesser extent, Chinese architecture. The mosque is centered around the prayer hall and has a courtyard on both sides of it.

The Id Kah Mosque consists of a chapel, a sutra hall, a gate tower and some other auxiliary buildings. The temple gate is made of yellow bricks, the gate is 4.7 meters high, 4.3 meters wide, and the gate building is about 17 meters high. Two 18-meter-high minarets are built asymmetrically on both sides of the gate tower, and a crescent moon stands on the top of the tower. At dawn each day, the imam in the temple will climb the tower five times and call for Muslims to come and worship. Behind the gate tower is a large arch, with a minaret at the top.

Entrance plaque
Radio Free Asia reported in 2018 that a plaque containing Quranic scriptures, which had long hung outside the front entrance of the mosque, had been removed by authorities. Turghunjan Alawudun of the World Uyghur Congress said that the move was "one aspect of the Chinese regime’s evil policies meant to eliminate the Islamic faith among Uyghurs, to eliminate Uyghur faith, literary works, and language." In May 2020, Radio Free Asia again reported on the removal of the plaque.

Current status

The Independent and The Globe and Mail have reported that the Id Kah Mosque has been transformed from a working mosque into a tourist attraction. Henryk Szadziewski from the US-based Uyghur Human Rights Project told Radio Free Asia that while the mosque remains standing, "its disappearance would cause outrage given its importance. The significance of its existence to the Chinese authorities is to demonstrate to the world observance of Uyghurs' religious freedoms." According to Uyghur imam Ali Akbar Dumallah, who fled China in 2012, scenes of small groups of people praying at the Id Kah and other mosques are staged by the government for visitors. According to the World Uyghur Congress, a mass celebration that took place outside Id Kah Mosque during the 2021 celebration Eid al-Fitr was staged as part of a propaganda facade by Chinese authorities to attempt to falsely portray Xinjiang as a region with strong religious freedom and to whitewash its religious repression in the region.

See also
 Uyghur genocide
 Xinjiang internment camps
 Islam in China
 List of mosques in China
 List of famous mosques
 Timeline of Islamic history
 Islamic architecture
 Islamic art

References

External links

Religious buildings and structures completed in 1442
15th-century mosques
Mosques in Xinjiang
Kashgar
Major National Historical and Cultural Sites in Xinjiang